David Bolt (born 1973) is an English male lawn and indoor bowler.

Bowls career
Bolt is an England international and was the National singles champion in 2011 and National fours champion in 2014 during the Men's National Championships.

In 2016, he won the Hong Kong International Bowls Classic singles title and the following year finished runner-up in the pairs with Taylor Monk.

He was selected as part of the English team for the 2018 Commonwealth Games on the Gold Coast in Queensland where he claimed a bronze medal in the Fours with Jamie Chestney, Louis Ridout and Sam Tolchard.

In 2019 he won the triples bronze medal at the Atlantic Bowls Championships and in 2021 was runner-up to Sam Tolchard in the National singles.

Personal life
Bolt was a postman by trade but set up a bowls shop business at the South Shields Bowling Centre in 2016.

References

1973 births
Living people
English male bowls players
Bowls players at the 2018 Commonwealth Games
Commonwealth Games bronze medallists for England
Commonwealth Games medallists in lawn bowls
Medallists at the 2018 Commonwealth Games